The genus Tretioscincus contains 3 species which are recognized as being valid.
Tretioscincus agilis  – smooth tegu
Tretioscincus bifasciatus  – Rio Magdalena tegu
Tretioscincus oriximinensis  – Oriximina lizard

References

 
Lizard genera
Taxa named by Edward Drinker Cope